Cosmocampus balli (Ball's pipefish) is a species of fish of the family Syngnathidae. It is endemic to Hawaii, with observations off Oahu and Kauai. Although little is known about its feeding habits, it is expected to consume small crustaceans, similar to other pipefishes. This species is ovoviviparous, with males carrying eggs and giving birth to live young.

Etymology
The specific name honours the American zoologist Stanley Crittenden Ball (1885-1956) in acknowledgement of his "interest in the fishes of Oceania".

References

Further reading

Hawaii's Fishes

balli
Marine fish
Endemic fauna of Hawaii
Taxa named by Henry Weed Fowler 
Fish described in 1925